James O'Brien (August 3, 1836 – May 28, 1903) was a Canadian merchant, wholesaler, and politician.

Born in Aughnagar, County Tyrone, Ireland, O'Brien was educated there and moved to Canada in 1850. In 1858, he started business in the wholesale clothing and dry goods trade in Montreal. He retired from that business in 1893. He was a director of the Montreal City and District Savings Bank, the Royal Victoria Life Insurance Company, and also a member of the Board of Trade. He was a Life Governor of the Montreal General Hospital, of the Western and Notre Dame Hospitals, and a trustee of St. Patrick's Orphan Asylum, and a Governor of Université Laval. He was one of the founders of the Dominion Commercial Travellers' Association. He was appointed to the Senate representing the senatorial division of Victoria, Quebec on the advice of Mackenzie Bowell on January 2, 1896. A Liberal-Conservative, he served 7 years until his death in 1903.

External links
 

1836 births
1903 deaths
Canadian senators from Quebec
Conservative Party of Canada (1867–1942) senators
Irish emigrants to pre-Confederation Quebec
Politicians from County Tyrone
Immigrants to the Province of Canada